The Department of Immigration & Passports of the Ministry of Home Affairs is the government organisation responsible for passports, immigration and migration in general in Bangladesh. It is located in Dhaka, the capital city of Bangladesh. The headquarters is located in Agargaon Passport office in Dhaka City. Major General Md. Nurul Anwar is the incumbent Director General (DG) of the Department of Immigration and Passports.

History
The department was established in 1973 by the government of Bangladesh after the Bangladesh Liberation war in 1971. In 2017 the department started making a bio-metric list of Rohingya Refugees in Bangladesh.

References

1973 establishments in Bangladesh
Organisations based in Dhaka
Government departments of Bangladesh
Immigration to Bangladesh
Passport offices